Middle of the Night is a 1959 American drama film directed by Delbert Mann, and released by Columbia Pictures. It was entered into the 1959 Cannes Film Festival. It stars Fredric March and Kim Novak. The screenplay was adapted by Paddy Chayefsky from his Broadway play of the same name.

Plot
A 24-year-old divorcee, Betty Preisser, a receptionist for a clothing manufacturer, takes some office work home which her boss, widower Jerry Kingsley, a man of 56, drops by to pick up. Professional rather than personal acquaintances, Betty tells Jerry of her loveless marriage to George, a musician. Jerry has a married daughter, Lillian, about her age, and a spinster sister, Evelyn, who is very protective of him.

Jerry works up the nerve to invite Betty to dinner. He meets Betty's mother, Mrs. Mueller, and sister Alice, who share the apartment with Betty. Their relationship grows, but she professes to be reluctant to date her employer. Jerry wonders if their age difference is really behind this reluctance. Despite this, a May–December relationship between them develops.

Female family members of both of them strongly disapprove. Mrs. Mueller calls him a "dirty old man," while Jerry's sister calls Betty a "fortune hunter" and him a fool, although Lillian's husband Jack offers his congratulations, earning scorn from his wife and causing them to quarrel. A colleague, Walter Lockman, trapped in a long and unhappy marriage, urges Jerry to do whatever it takes to find true happiness.

George returns to town and tries to persuade Betty to return to him. In a moment of weakness, they have a romantic tryst. Betty regrets it and explains to Jerry that it meant nothing to her emotionally, but he feels humiliated. His sister observes how depressed Jerry has become when he returns home. At his lowest ebb, he learns that Walter has taken an overdose of pills in a likely suicide attempt. Jerry sees it as a sign to seize the joy in life while he still can. He returns to Betty.

Cast

TV play
The story originally appeared as an episode of The Philco-Goodyear Television Playhouse on September 19, 1954, also directed by Delbert Mann and with E. G. Marshall and Eva Marie Saint in the lead roles.

Stage play
Chayefsky adapted it into a stage play. It was directed by Joshua Logan, who was so impressed by Chayefsky's writing he agreed to direct when only the first two acts were written. The leads were played by Edward G. Robinson and Gena Rowlands. The play was successful and ran for over a year. Logan thought the film version was poor with miscast leads and too much of a "guy play" and felt Chayefsky had too much power.

Production
Frank Thompson designed the costumes for the film. Future Oscar winners Martin Balsam (A Thousand Clowns, 1965) and Lee Grant (Shampoo, 1975) also star in this film, which was mildly controversial in its day. It was originally a stage play starring Edward G. Robinson.  Some of the stage cast were in the film.

Reception
Bosley Crowther, in a mixed but approving review for The New York Times, said that the film "fitly" brings Chayefsky's play to the screen, but found it bleaker than the play, which had touches of ethnic humor that the film does not:The characters are more intense and driven by their lonely and neurotic moods [than are those in the play]. They fumble and paw at each other in a more avid and frenzied way, and their squabbles and indecisions are more violent and sweaty with pain. Mr. Chayefsky and Delbert Mann, the director, have worked for the taut, dramatic thing. They haven't wasted much time on humor. This is loneliness, boy, and it is grim. But something that was quite attractive on the stage is not in the film. That is the humor and the temperament of a particular ethnic group. Mr. March is an excellent actor when it comes to showing joy and distress but he isn't successful at pretending to be a Jewish papa and business man.

Awards
Palme d'Or, Cannes Film Festival - nominated
Best Actor Golden Globe (Fredric March) - nominated
Top Ten Films of the Year, National Board of Review

References

External links

1950s American films
1950s English-language films
1959 films
1959 romantic drama films
American black-and-white films
American films based on plays
American romantic drama films
Columbia Pictures films
Films based on adaptations
Films based on television plays
Films directed by Delbert Mann
Films set in New York City
Films shot in New York City
Films with screenplays by Paddy Chayefsky